Verdes FC (previously Hankook Verdes) is a Belizean association football club which competes in the Premier League of Belize. They are currently based in San Ignacio, Belize, a town situated in the district of Cayo, Belize. The club was established in 1976 as Real Verdes Football Club and changed their name to Hankook Verdes in 2004. They are now known only as Verdes FC, locally being called only Verdes. The club is one of the oldest active professional football teams in Belize and has been in existence since the inception of the Football Federation of Belize. Their home games are played at Norman Broaster Stadium.

The club has established an excellent reputation for the development of many past and current members of the Belize national football team, despite not having won any club championships at the national level until 2008. Verdes had previously won the amateur Belize National Football Association championship in 1986. In 2004, Hankook Verdes announced that they would opt out of the Belize Premier Football League due to unprofessional conduct, including late arrivals by officials and the other team, prior to a match against Kulture Yabra. Verdes FC's recent league championships include the opening season of the 2019–20 Premier League and both seasons of the 2021–22 FFB Top League, where they went undefeated.

In 1985, Hankook Verdes was the first team to represent Belize in the CONCACAF Champions' Cup. They have appeared in eight editions of the competition and twice in its successor, the CONCACAF Champions League. Throughout the history of Belizean football, Real Verdes has represented its country more than any other club in Belize. The list of CONCACAF opponents includes professional teams such as Cruz Azul, UNAM, Santos Laguna, Querétaro (Mexico); Real España, Platense, Pumas UNAH (Honduras); Xelajú, Municipal, Comunicaciones, (Guatemala);San Francisco (Panama); and Luis Ángel Firpo (El Salvador);Arcahaie (Haiti). Hankook Verdes has the most UNCAF Club Tournament appearances of any Belize football club.

Verdes FC appeared in three consecutive editions of the CONCACAF League from 2020 to 2022 and were the second Belizean club to participate in the tournament. Their first attempt in 2020 was halted by a COVID-19 outbreak among the players and the need to quarantine in Panama rather than being able to transit to the CONCACAF League venue in Santo Domingo. Their preliminary round match was cancelled and their opponents, Haitian side Arcahaie FC, was awarded a 3–0 walkover victory. In 2022, they became the first Belizean club to win a competitive series in the competition.

Achievements
Premier League of Belize: 3
 2014–15 C, 2017-18 O, 2019-20 O
Belize Premier Football League: 1
 2007–08

Performance in International competitions

 CONCACAF Champions' Cup and Champions League: 10 appearances
Best: Group stage in 2015–16
1986 CONCACAF Champions' Cup
1987 CONCACAF Champions' Cup
1988 CONCACAF Champions' Cup
1991 CONCACAF Champions' Cup
1994 CONCACAF Champions' Cup
1995 CONCACAF Champions' Cup
1997 CONCACAF Champions' Cup
1998 CONCACAF Champions' Cup
2008–09: Preliminary Round
2015–16: Group stage
CONCACAF League: 3 appearances
Best: Round of 16 in 2022
2020: Withdrew
2021: Preliminary Round
2022: Round of 16
Copa Interclubes UNCAF: 4 appearances
Best: First Round in 1995, 1999, 2006
1993: Preliminary Round
1994: Preliminary Round
1995: First Round
1999: First Round
2006: First Round

International level
 As of 21 August 2015

 Friendly matches not included.
 Games decided by penalty shootout are counted as ties.

Current squad

Notable former players
 Erwin Contreras (Captain, Belize national football team, 1990–93)
 Jorge García (Captain, Belize national football team, 1994–97)

Managers

Real Verdes
Antonio Carlos Vieira

Verdes Hancock
 Nayo Waight (2005)
 Ramon Cayoc (2008)

Verdes FC
 Alberto Rafael "Chapay" Contreras (1980s-1990s)
 Walter Salazar (2013)
 Pablo Cacho (2014–15)
 Walter Salazar (2015–2017)
  Marvin Ottley (2017–)
 Martín Dimas Dall'orso (2019–2021)
 David Pérez Asensio (July 2021 –)

References

External links
Hankook Verdes

Football clubs in Belize
Association football clubs established in 1976
1976 establishments in Belize